"Stay Wild" is a song by Australian band Little Birdy, released as the fourth single from their third studio album Confetti. It was released digitally in October 2009.

Release
Initially "Confetti" was planned for release as a single, but this was changed to "Stay Wild". A music video was produced to promote the single. It features Katy Steele out there in the country surrounded by the green, surveying her surrounds, perusing Boinga Bob’s iconic Warburton, Victoria home. Joined by the rest of the band (each carrying a different coloured flag), she sets out into the great wild outdoors to breathe in the crisp fresh air.

References

2009 singles
Little Birdy songs
2009 songs
Eleven: A Music Company singles
Songs written by Katy Steele